Against the Night is the second album, released originally in 1999, by Jason Webley. It was re-released by Springman Records in 2003.  He has been known to regard it as his depressing album, "the soundtrack to a subtle apocalypse."  It is his most popular album to date, and Webley regards it as the album where he really comes into his own as a songwriter.

The track "Last Song" appeared in the ninth episode of the podcast Welcome to Night Vale, titled "PYRAMID".

Track listing 
 "Against the Night" – 4:41
 "2 am" – 2:19
 "Entropy" – 1:24
 "Winter" – 4:05
 "Devil be Good" – 2:54
 "Jack of Spades" – 1:55
 "Dance While the Sky Crashes Down" – 4:29
 "Ontogeny" – 2:15
 "Again the Night" – 3:40
 "Millennium Bug" – 4:02
 "Constellation Prize" – 2:12
 "Absinthe Makes the Heart Grow Fonder" – 5:23
 "Eleutheria" – 4:59
 "Captain, Where are We Going Now?" – 5:17
 "Back to the Garden" – 4:01
 "Last Song" – 6:05
 "Lullaby" – 2:18

Personnel 
 Performed by Jason Webley.
 Drums on "Ontogeny", "Constellation Prize", and "Back to the Garden" by Michael McQuilken.
 Electric guitar on "Back to the Garden" by John Osebold.
 Screaming on "2 am" recorded at the Blue Moon Tavern.
 Additional vocals on "Eleutheria" by Lauryn Cook's alternative tribe, and on "Back to the Garden" by John Banfill, Ben Dunlap, Jeff Harms, and Grant Mandarino.

References 

Jason Webley albums
1999 albums